Hay House is a publisher founded in 1984 by author Louise Hay, who is known for her books on New Thought. Hay House has its headquarters in Carlsbad, California, and is (as of 2018) run by Reid Tracy. Hay House describes itself as a "mind-body-spirit and transformational enterprise". Their target audience is readers interested in self-help, personal growth, and alternative medicine.

History
Hay House was founded in 1984, and incorporated in 1987, to market Louise Hay's self-help books, including, Heal Your Body and You Can Heal Your Life. Soon after, Hay House began publishing for other authors that fall into the category of mind-body-spirit such as Wayne Dyer, Suze Orman, Deepak Chopra, Marianne Williamson, Sylvia Browne, Tavis Smiley, Esther Hicks and Doreen Virtue.

Reid Tracy joined Hay House as an accountant in 1988. He went on to take over as the CEO in 1990 at the age of 25.

They are headquartered in Carlsbad, California, with auxiliary offices in New York City, London, Sydney, Johannesburg, and New Delhi.

According to The New York Times Magazine, the publisher sold more than 6 million books and other products in 2007, bringing in US$100 million in revenues. As of 2018, Hay House reports that they publish books by more than 130 authors and sells their products and services in over 35 countries and that they employ over 100 full time staff members.

Mission and practice

Hay House publishes authors who write on such topics as psychic reading, energy healing, meditation, tarot cards, alternative medicine, numerology, astrology, and holistic health. Hay House hosts group events where fans can pay for admission to seminars by the authors who can then make presentations. They also publish CDs, DVDs, calendars and card decks.

The publisher also offers a radio station, Hay House Radio, which provides live radio shows by Hay House authors. They also have spin off websites such as Hay House Online Learning, a place to take online classes by their authors, and Heal Your Life, an online self-help and personal growth program. These services are available as applications for phones and tablets. They also have a division called Balboa Press, a self publishing company, which was created in partnership with Author Solutions in 2010.

Hay House promotes the idea that "traditional Western learning, as codified by universities that bestow fancy degrees, is woefully incomplete, sometimes harmful, and must be supplemented by other ways of knowing". Hay House founder, Louise Hay, explains that Hay House does not actually endorse everything their authors write. They also do turn away some authors and work hard to stay on trend with the latest fashions in self-help.

In a 2008 article, Oppenheimer quotes current CEO, Reid Tracy, as saying: "As of right now we’ve sold over 40 million products in the U.S., and we think a lot of those people have been helped." Hay House does not test the claims made by their authors. The authors gain merit with the publisher based on the testimonials they receive as opposed to the credibility or accuracy of their claims.

References

New Thought literature
Publishing companies established in 1984
Book publishing companies based in California
Companies based in Carlsbad, California
1984 establishments in California
Publishing
Self-publishing